Nordstern is a linear sans-serif typeface designed by Rolf Benjamin Fleischmann and published by Büro Sequenz in St. Gallen, Switzerland. It is geometrically constructed in a high x-height and comes in three weights: Normal (regular), Hell (light) and Dunkel (dark). Originally developed for a particular project, it was extended and digitized in 2015.

See also 
 List of typefaces

References

External links 
 Fonts at Büro Sequenz
 Nordstern at fontspring.com
 Nordstern extended font details

Sans-serif typefaces